Baylar may refer to:

 Bəylər, Azerbaijan
 Baylar, Iran
 Baylar, Qazvin, Iran